is a Japanese gravure idol and actress who is represented by the talent agency Oscar Promotion. She was a member of Pretty Club 31 and Teenage Club.

Filmography

TV series

Films

References

External links
 Official blog and profile 

Japanese gravure idols
Japanese actresses
1988 births
Living people
People from Kyoto